The 2007 Norfolk State Spartans football team represented Norfolk State University in the 2007 NCAA Division I FCS football season. The Spartans were led by third-year head coach Pete Adrian and played their home games at William "Dick" Price Stadium. They were a member of the Mid-Eastern Athletic Conference. They finished the season 8–3, 6–2 in MEAC play.

Schedule

References

Norfolk State
Norfolk State Spartans football seasons
Norfolk State Spartans football